In the 1982–83 season, MC Alger is competing in the National for the 16th season, as well as the Algerian Cup. It is their 9th consecutive season in the top flight of Algerian football. They will be competing in National, and the Algerian Cup.

Pre-season and friendlies

Competitions

Overview

Championnat National

League table

Results by round

Matches

Algerian Cup

Squad information

Appearances and goals

|-
! colspan=10 style=background:#dcdcdc; text-align:center| Goalkeepers

|-
! colspan=10 style=background:#dcdcdc; text-align:center| Defenders

|-
! colspan=10 style=background:#dcdcdc; text-align:center| Midfielders

|-
! colspan=10 style=background:#dcdcdc; text-align:center| Forwards

Goalscorers
Includes all competitive matches. The list is sorted alphabetically by surname when total goals are equal.

References

External links
 Algeria 1982/83 season at rsssf.com 
 1982–83 MP Alger season at footballvintage.net 
 1982–83 MP Alger season at sebbar.kazeo.com 

MC Alger seasons
Algerian football clubs 1982–83 season